Billy Herod was an American football coach.  He served as the head football coach at Indiana University Bloomington for one season in 1891, compiling a record of 1–5.

Head coaching record

References

Year of birth missing
Year of death missing
Indiana Hoosiers football coaches